Arthur Gingell (born 30 September 1883 in Bristol - died 20 February 1947 in Cleveland, Ohio, USA) was a British wrestler who competed in the 1908 Summer Olympics. In 1908, at the 1908 Summer Olympics, he won the bronze medal in the freestyle wrestling lightweight class.

References

External links
Olympic Profile

1883 births
1947 deaths
Sportspeople from Bristol
Olympic wrestlers of Great Britain
Wrestlers at the 1908 Summer Olympics
British male sport wrestlers
Olympic bronze medallists for Great Britain
Olympic medalists in wrestling
Medalists at the 1908 Summer Olympics